Pope Philotheos of Alexandria, was the 63rd Pope of Alexandria and Patriarch of the See of St. Mark.

It was during his office that a conflict between Alexandria and the King of Axum that began in the time of Cosmas III ended, helped by the efforts of Georgios II of Makuria. Due to Georgios' successful diplomacy, Philotheos ordained a new abuna or metropolitan bishop, Abuna Daniel, for the Ethiopian Orthodox Church after an interregnum of many years.

References

Philetheos
11th-century Coptic Orthodox popes of Alexandria